Want is a repackaged double album by Canadian-American singer-songwriter Rufus Wainwright, released in the United Kingdom on November 28, 2005. It contains all the tracks from both Want One and Want Two, along with two bonus tracks: a cover of Leonard Cohen's "Chelsea Hotel No. 2" along with "In with the Ladies".

Track listing
All songs written by Wainwright, unless otherwise noted.

Disc 1
"Oh What a World" – 4:23
"I Don't Know What It Is" – 4:51
"Vicious World" – 2:50
"Movies of Myself" – 4:30
"Pretty Things" – 2:40
"Go or Go Ahead" – 6:38
"Vibrate" – 2:44
"14th Street" – 4:44
"Natasha" – 3:28
"Harvester of Hearts" – 3:35
"Beautiful Child" – 4:15
"Want" – 5:10
"11:11" – 4:27
"Dinner at Eight" – 4:33
 
Disc 2
 "Agnus Dei" – 5:45
 "The One You Love" – 3:44
 "Peach Trees" – 5:59
 "Little Sister" – 3:22
 "The Art Teacher" – 3:51
 "Hometown Waltz" – 2:33
 "This Love Affair" – 3:13
 "Gay Messiah" – 3:14
 "Memphis Skyline" – 4:51
 "Waiting for a Dream" – 4:14
 "Crumb by Crumb" – 4:13
 "Old Whore's Diet" – 9:09
 "Chelsea Hotel No. 2" (Leonard Cohen) – 3:55
 "In with the Ladies" (Alex Gifford, Wainwright) – 3:52

Personnel
Want One

 Rufus Wainwright – voice (1–14), piano (2,5,8,10,14), fender rhodes piano (3), recorders (3), acoustic guitar (4,6,11–13), keyboards (9), orchestral arrangements (1,2,7,9,14), choral arrangements (7)
 Marius de Vries – piano (1,7,8,12,13), programming (1–4,6–14), vibraphone (10,12), orchestral arrangements (1,2,7,14), choral arrangements (7)
 Joy Smith – harp (1,2,13,14)
 Nick Hitchens – tuba (1)
 Isobel Griffiths – orchestra contractor (1,2,7,14)
 Gavyn Wright – orchestra leader (1,2,7,14)
 Alexis Smith – programming (1–4,6–14)
 Simon C Clarke – alto sax (1,8,11), baritone sax (1,8,10,11), flute (1,2,14), alto flute (1), piccolo (1)
 Tim Sanders – tenor sax (1,8,10,11)
 Roddy Lorimer – trumpet (1,2,8,10,11), flugelhorn (10)
 Paul Spong – trumpet (1,2,8,11)
 Annie Whitehead – trombone (1,2,8,10,11)
 Dave Stewart – bass trombone (1,2,11)
 Sterling Campbell – drums (2–4,13)
 Jeff Hill – bass (2,4,6,8,11–13)

 Gerry Leonard – guitar (2,8), electric guitar (4,6,11–13), mandolin (13)
 Charlie Sexton – guitar (2,8), electric guitar (4,6,11,12)
 Jimmy Zhivago – guitar (2), electric guitar (4), piano (8)
 Alexandra Knoll – oboe (2)
 David Sapadin – clarinet (2)
 Daniel Shelly – bassoon (2)
 Bernard O'Neill – bass (3,9,10)
 Matt Johnson – drums (6,9,11,12)
 The London Oratory Choir – choir (7)
 Levon Helm – drums (8)
 Kate McGarrigle – banjo (8), accordion (14)
 Martha Wainwright – additional vocals (8,12)
 Jenni Muldaur – additional vocals (8,12)
 Adrian Hallowell – bass trombone (8,11)
 Maxim Moston – concertmaster (9), orchestral arrangements (1,2,7,9,14)
 Teddy Thompson – additional vocals (10)
 Linda Thompson – additional vocals (10)
 Chris Elliott – orchestral arrangements (1,2,7,9,14)

Want Two

 Rufus Wainwright – voice (1–12), piano (1–7,9,10), additional vocals (2,3,8,11), acoustic guitar (2,3,8,11), keyboards (11), orchestral arrangements (1,4,7,9–11)
 Sophie Solomon – violin (1)
 Pit Hermans – cimbalom (1)
 Marius de Vries – keyboards (1,10,11), vibraphone (3,9), programming (2–4,8,9–11), orchestral arrangements (1,4,7,9–11)
 Stefano de Silva – engineer
 Isobel Griffiths – orchestra contractor (1,4,9,11), horn contractor (5,10)
 Gavyn Wright – orchestral leader (1,4,9,11)
 Martha Wainwright – additional vocals (2,3,6,8,12), violin (6)
 Gerry Leonard – electric guitar (2,3), guitars (9)
 Charlie Sexton – electric guitar (2,3)
 Jeff Hill – bass (2,3,8–12), additional vocals (12)
 Levon Helm – drums (2)
 Roberto Rodriguez – percussion (3)
 Sterling Campbell – drums (3,9)
 Matt Johnson – drums (3,8)
 Kate McGarrigle – additional vocals (6), banjo (6)
 Anna McGarrigle – additional vocals (6), accordion (6)
 Lily Lanken – additional vocals (6), recorder (6)
 Brad Albetta – bass (6)
 Maxim Moston – violin (7,10,12), concertmaster (7,10), orchestral arrangements (1,4,7,9–11)
 Antoine Silverman – violin (7,10)
 Joan Wasser – violin (7,10), viola (12)
 Julianne Klopotic – violin (7,10)
 Vivienne Kim – violin (7,10)
 Fiona Murray – violin (7,10)

 Cenovia Cummins – violin (7,10)
 Christopher Cardona – violin (7,10)
 Danielle Farina – viola (7,10)
 Alison Gordon – viola (7,10)
 Eric Hammelman – viola (7,10)
 Kathryn Lockwood – viola (7,10)
 Anja Wood – cello (7,10)
 Jane Scarpantoni – cello (7,10)
 Julia Kent – cello (7,10,12)
 Carlo Pellettieri – cello (7,10)
 Troy Rinker Jr – bass (7,10)
 Alexandra Knoll – oboe (7)
 David Sapadin – clarinet (7)
 Daniel Shelly – bassoon (7)
 Teddy Thompson – additional vocals (8,12)
 Jenni Muldaur – additional vocals (8)
 Suzzy Roche – additional vocals (8)
 Leona Naess – additional vocals (11)
 David Theodore – oboe (11)
 Rob Burger – Hammond organ (11)
 Gina Gershon – jaw harp (11)
 Antony – voice (12)
 Julianna Raye – additional vocals (12)
 Roger Greenawalt – ukulele (12), banjo (12)
 Steven Wolf – djembe (12), tambourine (12), additional programming (12)
 Alexis Smith – programming (2–4,8–11)
 Van Dyke Parks – orchestral arrangements (1,4,7,9–11)

References

External links
Rufus Wainwright's official site

2005 albums
Albums produced by Marius de Vries
Rufus Wainwright albums